Salzburg (literally "Salt-Castle") is the fourth-largest city in Austria. In 2020, it had a population of 156,872.

The town is on the site of the Roman settlement of Iuvavum. Salzburg was founded as an episcopal see in 696 and became a seat of the archbishop in 798. Its main sources of income were salt extraction, trade, and gold mining. The fortress of Hohensalzburg, one of the largest medieval fortresses in Europe, dates from the 11th century. In the 17th century, Salzburg became a center of the Counter-Reformation, with monasteries and numerous Baroque churches built.

Salzburg's historic center is renowned for its Baroque architecture and is one of the best-preserved city centers north of the Alps. The historic center was enlisted as a UNESCO World Heritage Site in 1996. The city has three universities and a large population of students. Tourists also visit Salzburg to tour the historic center and the scenic Alpine surroundings.

History

Antiquity to the High Middle Ages
Traces of human settlements have been found in the area, dating to the Neolithic Age. The first settlements in Salzburg continuous with the present were apparently by the Celts around the 5th century BC.

Around 15 BC the Roman Empire merged the settlements into one city. At this time, the city was called "Juvavum" and was awarded the status of a Roman municipium in 45 AD. Juvavum developed into an important town of the Roman province of Noricum. After the Norican frontier's collapse, Juvavum declined so sharply that by the late 7th century it nearly became a ruin.

The Life of Saint Rupert credits the 8th-century saint with the city's rebirth. When Theodo of Bavaria asked Rupert to become bishop c. 700, Rupert reconnoitered the river for the site of his basilica. Rupert chose Juvavum, ordained priests, and annexed the manor of Piding. Rupert named the city "Salzburg". He travelled to evangelise among pagans.

The name Salzburg means "Salt-Castle" (Latin: Salis Burgium). The name derives from the barges carrying salt on the River Salzach, which were subject to a toll in the 8th century as was customary for many communities and cities on European rivers. Hohensalzburg Fortress, the city's fortress, was built in 1077 by Archbishop Gebhard, who made it his residence. It was greatly expanded during the following centuries.

Independence
Independence from Bavaria was secured in the late 14th century. Salzburg was the seat of the Archbishopric of Salzburg, a prince-bishopric of the Holy Roman Empire. As the Reformation movement gained steam, riots broke out among peasants in the areas in and around Salzburg. The city was occupied during the German Peasants' War, and the Archbishop had to flee to the safety of the fortress. It was besieged for three months in 1525.

Eventually, tensions were quelled, and the city's independence led to an increase in wealth and prosperity, culminating in the late 16th to 18th centuries under the Prince Archbishops Wolf Dietrich von Raitenau, Markus Sittikus, and Paris Lodron. It was in the 17th century that Italian architects (and Austrians who had studied the Baroque style) rebuilt the city center as it is today along with many palaces.

Modern era

Religious conflict

On 31 October 1731, the 214th anniversary of the 95 Theses, Archbishop Count Leopold Anton von Firmian signed an Edict of Expulsion, the Emigrationspatent, directing all Protestant citizens to recant their non-Catholic beliefs. 21,475 citizens refused to recant their beliefs and were expelled from Salzburg. Most of them accepted an offer by King Friedrich Wilhelm I of Prussia, travelling the length and breadth of Germany to their new homes in East Prussia. The rest settled in other Protestant states in Europe and the British colonies in America.

Illuminism
In 1772–1803, under archbishop Hieronymus Graf von Colloredo, Salzburg was a center of late Illuminism. Colloredo is known for being one of the main employers of Mozart. He often had arguments with Mozart and he dismissed him by saying, "Soll er doch gehen, ich brauche ihn nicht!" (may he leave; I don't need him!). Mozart would leave Salzburg for Vienna in 1781 with his family, though his father Leopold stayed back as he had a close relationship with Colloredo.

Electorate of Salzburg
In 1803, the archbishopric was secularised by Emperor Napoleon; he transferred the territory to Ferdinando III of Tuscany, former Grand Duke of Tuscany, as the Electorate of Salzburg.

Austrian annexation of Salzburg
In 1805, Salzburg was annexed to the Austrian Empire, along with the Berchtesgaden Provostry.

Salzburg under Bavarian rule
In 1809, the territory of Salzburg was transferred to the Kingdom of Bavaria after Austria's defeat at Wagram.

Division of Salzburg and annexation by Austria and Bavaria
After the Congress of Vienna with the Treaty of Munich (1816), Salzburg was definitively returned to Austria, but without Rupertigau and Berchtesgaden, which remained with Bavaria. Salzburg was integrated into the Province of Salzach and Salzburgerland was ruled from Linz.

In 1850, Salzburg's status was restored as the capital of the Duchy of Salzburg, a crownland of the Austrian Empire. The city became part of Austria-Hungary in 1866 as the capital of a crownland of the Austrian Empire. The nostalgia of the Romantic Era led to increased tourism. In 1892, a funicular was installed to facilitate tourism to Hohensalzburg Fortress.

20th century

First Republic
Following World War I and the dissolution of the Austro-Hungarian Empire, Salzburg, as the capital of one of the Austro-Hungarian territories, became part of the new German Austria. In 1918, it represented the residual German-speaking territories of the Austrian heartlands. This was replaced by the First Austrian Republic in 1919, after the Treaty of Saint-Germain-en-Laye (1919).

Annexation by the Third Reich

The Anschluss (the occupation and annexation of Austria, including Salzburg, into the Third Reich) took place on 12 March 1938, one day before a scheduled referendum on Austria's independence. German troops moved into the city. Political opponents, Jewish citizens and other minorities were subsequently arrested and deported to concentration camps. The synagogue was destroyed. After Germany invaded the Soviet Union, several POW camps for prisoners from the Soviet Union and other enemy nations were organized in the city.

During the Nazi occupation, a Romani camp was built in Salzburg-Maxglan. It was an Arbeitserziehungslager (work 'education' camp), which provided slave labor to local industry. It also operated as a Zwischenlager (transit camp), holding Roma before their deportation to German camps or ghettos in German-occupied territories in eastern Europe.

World War II

Allied bombing destroyed 7,600 houses and killed 550 inhabitants. Fifteen air strikes destroyed 46 percent of the city's buildings, especially those around Salzburg railway station. Although the town's bridges and the dome of the cathedral were destroyed, much of its Baroque architecture remained intact. As a result, Salzburg is one of the few remaining examples of a town of its style. American troops entered the city on 5 May 1945 and it became the centre of the American-occupied area in Austria. Several displaced persons camps were established in Salzburgamong them Riedenburg, Camp Herzl (Franz-Josefs-Kaserne), Camp Mülln, Bet Bialik, Bet Trumpeldor, and New Palestine.

Today
After World War II, Salzburg became the capital city of the Federal State of Salzburg (Land Salzburg) and saw the Americans leave the area once Austria had signed a 1955 treaty re-establishing the country as a democratic and independent nation and subsequently declared its perpetual neutrality. In the 1960s, the city became the shooting and setting of the family musical film The Sound of Music. On 27 January 2006, the 250th anniversary of the birth of Wolfgang Amadeus Mozart, all 35 churches of Salzburg rang their bells after 8:00 p.m. (local time) to celebrate the occasion. Major celebrations took place throughout the year.

As of 2017 Salzburg had a GDP per capita of €46,100, which was greater than the average for Austria and most European countries.

Geography
Salzburg is on the banks of the River Salzach, at the northern boundary of the Alps. The mountains to Salzburg's south contrast with the rolling plains to the north. The Altstadt, or "old town", is dominated by its baroque towers and churches and the massive Hohensalzburg Fortress. This area is flanked by two smaller hills, the Mönchsberg and Kapuzinerberg, which offer green relief within the city. Salzburg has about the same latitude as Seattle.

Due to its proximity to the Austrian-German border, the greater Salzburg urban area has sometimes been regarded as, unofficially, including contiguous parts of Germany, including Freilassing (until 1923 known as Salzburghofen), Ainring and Piding.

Climate
Salzburg is part of the temperate zone. The Köppen climate classification specifies the climate as a humid continental climate (Dfb). However, with the  isotherm for the coldest month, Salzburg can be classified as having four-season oceanic climate with significant temperature differences between seasons. Due to the location at the northern rim of the Alps, the amount of precipitation is comparatively high, mainly in the summer months. The specific drizzle is called Schnürlregen in the local dialect. In winter and spring, pronounced foehn winds regularly occur.

Population

Salzburg's official population significantly increased in 1935 when the city absorbed adjacent municipalities. After World War II, numerous refugees found a new home in the city. New residential space was constructed for American soldiers of the postwar occupation and could be used for refugees when they left. Around 1950, Salzburg passed the mark of 100,000 citizens, and in 2016, it reached the mark of 150000 citizens.

Salzburg is home to large German, Bosnian, Serbian, and Romanian communities.

Largest groups of immigrants by 1 January 2021 :

Architecture

Romanesque and Gothic
The Romanesque and Gothic churches, the monasteries and the early carcass houses dominated the medieval city for a long time. The Cathedral of Archbishop Conrad of Wittelsbach was the largest basilica north of the Alps. The choir of the Franciscan Church, construction was begun by Hans von Burghausen and completed by Stephan Krumenauer, is one of the most prestigious religious gothic constructions of southern Germany. At the end of the Gothic era Nonnberg Abbey, the Margaret Chapel in St Peter's Abbey, St George's Chapel, and the stately halls of the "Hoher Stock" in Hohensalzburg Fortress were constructed.

Renaissance and baroque
Inspired by Vincenzo Scamozzi, Prince-Archbishop Wolf Dietrich von Raitenau began to transform the medieval town to the architectural ideals of the late Renaissance. Plans for a massive cathedral by Scamozzi failed to materialize upon the fall of the archbishop. A second cathedral planned by Santino Solari rose as the first early Baroque church in Salzburg. It served as an example for many other churches in Southern Germany and Austria. Markus Sittikus and Paris von Lodron continued to rebuild the city with major projects such as Hellbrunn Palace, the prince archbishop's residence, the university buildings, fortifications, and many other buildings. Giovanni Antonio Daria managed by order of Prince Archbishop Guido von Thun the construction of the residential well. Giovanni Gaspare Zuccalli, by order of the same archbishop, created the Erhard and the Kajetan church in the south of the town. The city's redesign was completed with buildings designed by Johann Bernhard Fischer von Erlach, donated by Prince Archbishop Johann Ernst von Thun.

After the era of Ernst von Thun, the city's expansion came to a halt, which is the reason why there are no churches built in the Rococo style. Sigismund von Schrattenbach continued with the construction of "Sigmundstor" and the statue of holy Maria on the cathedral square. With the fall and division of the former "Fürsterzbistum Salzburg" (Archbishopric) to Upper Austria, Bavaria (Rupertigau) and Tyrol (Zillertal Matrei) began a long period of urban stagnancy. This era didn't end before the period of promoterism (Gründerzeit) brought new life into urban development. The builder dynasty Jakob Ceconi and Carl Freiherr von Schwarz filled major positions in shaping the city in this era.

Classical modernism and post-war modernism

Buildings of classical modernism and in particular, post-war modernism is frequently encountered in Salzburg. Examples are the Zahnwurzen house (a house in the Linzergasse 22 in the right center of the old town), the "Lepi" (public baths in Leopoldskron) (built 1964), and the original 1957 constructed congress-center of Salzburg, which was replaced by a new building in 2001. An important and famous example of the architecture of this era is the 1960 opening of the Großes Festspielhaus by Clemens Holzmeister.

Contemporary architecture
Adding contemporary architecture to Salzburg's old town without risking its UNESCO World Heritage status is problematic. Nevertheless, some new structures have been added: the Mozarteum at the Baroque Mirabell Garden (Architecture Robert Rechenauer), the 2001 Congress House (Architecture: Freemasons), the 2011 Unipark Nonntal (Architecture: Storch Ehlers Partners), the 2001 "Makartsteg" bridge (Architecture: HALLE1), and the "Residential and Studio House" of the architects Christine and Horst Lechner in the middle of Salzburg's old town (winner of the architecture award of Salzburg 2010). Other examples of contemporary architecture lie outside the old town: the Faculty of Science building (Universität Salzburg – Architecture Willhelm Holzbauer) built on the edge of free green space, the blob architecture of Red Bull Hangar-7 (Architecture: Volkmar Burgstaller) at Salzburg Airport, home to Dietrich Mateschitz's Flying Bulls and the Europark Shopping Centre. (Architecture: Massimiliano Fuksas)

Districts

Salzburg has twenty-four urban districts and three extra-urban populations.
Urban districts (Stadtteile):

 Aigen
 Altstadt
 Elisabeth-Vorstadt
 Gneis
 Gneis-Süd
 Gnigl
 Itzling
 Itzling-Nord
 Kasern
 Langwied
 Lehen
 Leopoldskron-Moos
 Liefering
 Maxglan
 Maxglan-West
 Morzg
 Mülln
 Neustadt
 Nonntal
 Parsch
 Riedenburg
 Salzburg-Süd
 Taxham
 Schallmoos

Extra-urban populations (Landschaftsräume):
 Gaisberg
 Hellbrunn
 Heuberg

Main sights

Salzburg is a tourist favorite, with the number of visitors outnumbering locals by a large margin in peak times. In addition to Mozart's birthplace noted above, other notable places include:

Old Town
 Historic center of the city of Salzburg, a World Heritage Site
 Baroque architecture, including many churches
 Felsenreitschule, an open-air theatre built in the quarry used for the construction of Salzburg Cathedral
 Franziskanerkirche, one of Salzburg's oldest buildings, dating from 1208 and used by the Franciscans since 1642
 Getreidegasse, a busy narrow shopping street characterized by numerous high townhouses
 Großes Festspielhaus, an opera house and concert hall dating from 1960 and built for the annual Salzburg Festival
 Haus für Mozart, formerly the Kleines Festspielhaus, an opera house and concert hall dating from 1925
 Hohensalzburg Fortress (Festung Hohensalzburg), overlooking the Old Town, one of the largest castles in Europe
 Holy Trinity Church (Dreifaltigkeitskirche), dating from 1694
 Hotel Goldener Hirsch, a five-star hotel located in a building on Getreidegasse dating back to at least 1407
 Kollegienkirche, the Baroque style church of the University of Salzburg
 Mirabell Palace (Schloss Mirabell), a pleasure palace built in 1606 with wide gardens and a marble hall
 Museum der Moderne Salzburg, a modern art museum with locations in the old city and on the Mönchsberg
 Mozartplatz, a historic square with monument to Wolfgang Amadeus Mozart
 Mozart's birthplace (Mozarts Geburtshaus), a house in Getreidegasse that is now a museum dedicated to Mozart
 Nonnberg Abbey (Stift Nonnberg), a Benedictine monastery founded c.712/715
 Residenz, the former residence of the Prince-Archbishops
 Residenzgalerie, an art museum in the Residenz
 Residenzplatz, a large square outside the Residenz with a large and ornate fountain
 Salzburg Cathedral (Salzburger Dom)
 Salzburger Landestheater, a theatre and venue for opera, theatre, and dance, with resident companies of actors, singers, and dancers
 Salzburger Marionettentheater, a marionette theatre established in 1912
 Salzburg Museum, a museum of the artistic and cultural history of the city and region of Salzburg
 Sigmundstor, an eighteenth-century tunnel connecting the Altstadt with the Riedenburg quarter through the Mönchsberg
 , a sculpture of a man on a golden sphere (Stephan Balkenhol, 2007)
 St Peter's Abbey (Stift Sankt Peter), a Benedictine monastery founded 696 with a well-known cemetery
  (Sebastianskirche), a church consecrated in 1511

Outside the Old Town
 Schloss Leopoldskron, a rococo palace and national historic monument in Leopoldskron-Moos, a southern district of Salzburg
 Hellbrunn with its parks and castles
 The Sound of Music tour companies who operate tours of film locations
 Hangar-7, a multifunctional building owned by Red Bull, with a collection of historical airplanes, helicopters, and Formula One racing cars

Greater Salzburg area
 Anif Castle, located south of the city in Anif
 Shrine of Our Lady of Maria Plain, a late Baroque church on the northern edge of Salzburg
 Salzburger Freilichtmuseum Großgmain, an open-air museum containing old farmhouses from all over the state assembled in a historic setting
 Schloss Klessheim, a palace and casino, formerly used by Adolf Hitler
 Berghof, Hitler's mountain retreat near Berchtesgaden
 Kehlsteinhaus, the only remnant of Hitler's Berghof
 Salzkammergut, an area of lakes east of the city
 Untersberg mountain, next to the city on the Austria–Germany border, with panoramic views of Salzburg and the surrounding Alps
 Skiing is an attraction during winter. Salzburg has no skiing facilities, but it is a gateway to skiing areas to the south. During the winter, its airport receives charter flights from around Europe.
 Salzburg Zoo, located south of the city in Anif

Education
Salzburg is a center of education and home to three universities, as well as several professional colleges and gymnasiums (high schools).

Universities and higher education institutions
 Salzburg University of Applied Sciences
 University of Salzburg, a federal public university
 Paracelsus Medical University
 Mozarteum University Salzburg, a public music and dramatic arts university
 Alma Mater Europaea, a private university
 SEAD – Salzburg Experimental Academy of Dance

Notable citizens

 Saint Liutberga (died c. 870)
 The composer Wolfgang Amadeus Mozart, born and raised in Salzburg when it was part of the Prince-Archbishopric of Salzburg within the Holy Roman Empire, was employed as a musician at the archbishopal court from 1773 to 1781. His house of birth and residence are tourist attractions. His family is buried in a small church graveyard in the old town, and there are many monuments to "Wolferl" in the city.
 The composer Johann Michael Haydn, brother of the composer Joseph Haydn. His works were admired by Mozart and Schubert. He was also the teacher of Carl Maria von Weber and Anton Diabelli and is known for his sacred music.
 Christian Doppler, expert on acoustic theory, was born in Salzburg. He is most known for his discovery of the Doppler effect.
 Josef Mohr, born in Salzburg. Together with Franz Gruber, he composed and wrote the text for "Silent Night". As a priest in neighboring Oberndorf he performed the song for the first time on Christmas Eve 1818.
 King Otto of Greece was born Prince Otto Friedrich Ludwig of Bavaria at the Palace of Mirabell, a few days before the city reverted from Bavarian to Austrian rule.
 Writer Stefan Zweig, lived in Salzburg for about 15 years, until 1934.
 The Trapp Family, including Georg von Trapp, Maria von Trapp, and their children lived in Salzburg until they fled to the United States following the Nazi takeover.
 Salzburg is the birthplace of Hans Makart, a 19th-century Austrian painter-decorator and national celebrity. Makartplatz (Makart Square) is named in his honor.
 Writer Thomas Bernhard, raised in Salzburg, spent part of his life there.
 Herbert von Karajan, notable orchestral conductor. He was born in Salzburg and died in 1989 in neighboring Anif.
 Roland Ratzenberger, Formula One driver, was born in Salzburg. He died in practice for the 1994 San Marino Grand Prix.
 Joseph Leutgeb, a virtuoso on the French horn, was part of the archbishop's court.
 Paracelsus, Swiss physician, alchemist, and astrologer of the German Renaissance died in Salzburg.
 Klaus Ager, the distinguished contemporary composer and Mozarteum professor, was born in Salzburg on 10 May 1946.
 Alex Jesaulenko, former Australian rules football-player for Carlton and Australian Football Hall of Fame member with "Legend" status was born in Salzburg on 2 August 1945.
 Barbara Thenn (1519-1579), merchant and Münzmeister
 Georg Trakl, one of the most important voices in German literature was born in Salzburg.
 Irma von Troll-Borostyani, an Austrian writer, journalist, and campaigner for women's rights
 Theodor Herzl, worked in the courts in Salzburg during the year after he earned his law degree in 1884.
 Skydiver and BASE Jumper Felix Baumgartner, who set three world records during the Red Bull Stratos project on 14 October 2012
 Franz Krieger, businessman and photographer, born in Salzburg
 Hilda Crozzoli, Austria's first female architect and civil engineer
 Ferdinand Habsburg, racing driver and heir apparent to the headship of the House of Habsburg-Lorraine

Events
 The Salzburg Festival is a famous music and theatre festival that attracts visitors during July and August each year. A smaller Salzburg Easter Festival is held around Easter each year.
 The Europrix multimedia award takes place in Salzburg.
 Electric Love Festival takes place in Salzburg.

Transport

Salzburg Hauptbahnhof is served by comprehensive rail connections, with frequent east-west trains serving Vienna, Munich, Innsbruck, and Zürich, including daily high-speed ICE services. North-south rail connections also serve popular destinations such as Venice and Prague. The city acts as a hub for southbound trains through the Alps into Italy.

Salzburg Airport has scheduled flights to European cities such as Frankfurt, Vienna, London, Rotterdam, Amsterdam, Brussels, Düsseldorf, and Zürich, as well as Hamburg, Edinburgh and Dublin. In addition to these, there are numerous charter flights.

In the main city, there is the Salzburg trolleybus system and bus system with a total of more than 20 lines, and service every 10 minutes. Salzburg has an S-Bahn system with four Lines (S1, S2, S3, S11), trains depart from the main station every 30 minutes, and they are part of the ÖBB network. Suburb line number S1 reaches the world-famous Silent Night chapel in Oberndorf in about 25 minutes.

Popular culture
In the 1960s, The Sound of Music, based on the true story of Maria von Trapp, who took up with an aristocratic family and fled the German Anschluss, used locations in and around Salzburg and the state of Salzburg as filming locations.

The city briefly appears on the map when Indiana Jones travels through the city in Indiana Jones and the Last Crusade.

Salzburg is the setting for the Austrian crime series Stockinger and an Austrian-German television crime drama series Der Pass.

In the 2010 film Knight & Day, Salzburg serves as the backdrop for a large portion of the film.

Language
Austrian German is widely written and differs from Germany's standard variation only in some vocabulary and a few grammar points. Salzburg belongs to the region of Austro-Bavarian dialects, in particular Central Bavarian. It is widely spoken by young and old alike although professors of linguistics from the Universität Salzburg, Irmgard Kaiser, and Hannes Scheutz, have seen over the past few years a reduction in the number of dialect speakers in the city. Although more and more school children are speaking standard German, Scheutz feels it has less to do with parental influence and more to do with media consumption.

Sports

Football

The former SV Austria Salzburg reached the UEFA Cup final in 1994. On 6 April 2005 Red Bull bought the club and changed its name to FC Red Bull Salzburg. The home stadium of Red Bull Salzburg is the Wals Siezenheim Stadium in a suburb in the agglomeration of Salzburg and was one of the venues for the 2008 European Football Championship. FC Red Bull Salzburg plays in the Austrian Bundesliga.

After Red Bull had bought the SV Austria Salzburg and changed its name and team colors, some supporters of the club decided to leave and form a new club with the old name and old colors, wanting to preserve the traditions of their club. The reformed SV Austria Salzburg was founded in 2005 and currently plays in the Erste Liga, only one tier below the Bundesliga.

Ice-hockey
Red Bull also sponsors the local ice hockey team, the EC Salzburg Red Bulls. The team plays in the Erste Bank Eishockey Liga, an Austria-headquartered cross-border league featuring the best teams from Austria, Hungary, Slovenia, Croatia, and Italy, as well as one Czech team.

Other sports
Salzburg was a candidate city for the 2010 and 2014 Winter Olympics, but lost to Vancouver and Sochi respectively.

International relations

Twin towns—sister cities
Salzburg is twinned with:

 Reims, Marne, Grand Est, France, since 1964
 Verona, Verona, Veneto, Italy, since 1973
 León, Nicaragua, since 1984
 Singida, Tanzania, since 1984
 Busseto, Parma, Emilia-Romagna, Italy, since 1988
 Vilnius, Lithuania, since 1989
 Dresden, Saxony, Germany, since 1991
 Kawasaki, Japan, since 1992
 Meran, South Tyrol, Trentino-Alto Adige/Südtirol, Italy, since 2000
 Shanghai, China, since 2004
 Jahrom, Iran, since 2019
 Leeds, England, since 2022

Gallery

See also

 List of World Heritage Sites in Austria

Notes

References

Bibliography

External links

 Salzburg, Austria – Travel guide at visit-salzburg.net
 
  – Informationen zum Outlet Salzburg

Salzburg
15 BC establishments
Austrian state capitals
Cities and towns in Salzburg (state)
Displaced persons camps in the aftermath of World War II
Districts of Salzburg (state)
World Heritage Sites in Austria
Holocaust locations in Austria